KRTZ (98.7 FM) is a radio station  broadcasting an adult contemporary format. Licensed to Cortez, Colorado, United States, the station serves the Four Corners area.  The station is currently owned by Winton Road Broadcasting, LLC.  Billed as a popular at-work station, it features hourly newscasts, along with regional news and information three times each day (7:20am, 12:20pm & 5:20pm). Among the air talent are Kelly Turner, host of Morning Modulation.  Mid-days are unhosted, billed as the Maximum Music Workday.  Afternoons, you can hear Adam Bomb.

References

External links
Corporate Station List

RTZ
Mainstream adult contemporary radio stations in the United States